The 2022 Scottish Open (officially the  2022 BetVictor Scottish Open) was a professional snooker tournament that took place from 28 November to 4 December 2022 at Meadowbank Sports Centre in Edinburgh, Scotland, the first time since the 2003 event that the tournament was staged in that city. It was the sixth ranking event of the 2022–23 season and the second tournament in the Home Nations Series, following the Northern Ireland Open and preceding the English Open and the Welsh Open. It was the third of eight tournaments in the season's European Series. Qualifiers were held from 4 to 9 October at the Chase Leisure Centre in Cannock, England, although matches involving the top 16 players in the world rankings were held over and played at the main venue. Sponsored by BetVictor, the tournament was broadcast by Eurosport in the UK and Europe. The winner received £80,000 from a total prize fund of £427,000.

Luca Brecel was the defending champion, having defeated John Higgins 9–5 in the 2021 final. However, Brecel lost 3–4 to Fraser Patrick in the first round. World number 32 Gary Wilson reached his third ranking final, having previously been runner-up at the 2015 China Open and the 2021 British Open, while world number 55 Joe O'Connor reached a ranking final for the first time. Wilson won the last six frames of the final to clinch a 9–2 victory over O'Connor and capture the first ranking title of his career.

Judd Trump compiled the highest break of the tournament, making the eighth maximum break of his career in his second-round match against Mitchell Mann. In doing so, Trump became only the second player, after Shaun Murphy, to make three maximums in a calendar year, having previously achieved 147s at the 2022 Turkish Masters and the 2022 Champion of Champions.

During his first-round match against Bai Langning, world number one Ronnie O'Sullivan was believed to have set a new record for the fastest televised century break, with the time initially given as three minutes and 24 seconds. However, after reviewing the footage, tour officials added ten seconds to the time of O'Sullivan's break, putting it three seconds outside the record of three minutes and 31 seconds set by Tony Drago at the 1996 UK Championship.

Prize fund 
The breakdown of prize money for this event is shown below:
 Winner: £80,000
 Runner-up: £35,000
 Semi-final: £17,500
 Quarter-final: £11,000
 Last 16: £7,500
 Last 32: £4,500
 Last 64: £3,000
 Highest break: £5,000
 Total: £427,000

Main draw

Top half

Bottom half

Final

Qualifying 
Qualification for the tournament took place from 9 to 14 October 2022 at the Chase Leisure Centre in Cannock.

 4–3 
 (32) 3–4 
 4–2 
 4–2 
 (17) 4–2 
 1–4 
 1–4 
 (24) 4–1 
 2–4 
 4–1 
 (25) 3–4 
 1–4 
 (28) 4–3 
 4–0 
 4–1 
 (21) 4–2 
 3–4 
 (20) 4–1 
 4–2 
 0–4 
 (29) 4–2 
 4–3 
 4–1 
 (30) 3–4 
 1–4 
 0–4 
 (19) 3–4 
 4–1 
 4–1 
 (22) 3–4 
 2–4 
 4–0 
 (27) 4–2 
 4–2 
 1–4 
 (26) 4–0 
 4–1 
 4–2 
 (23) 4–2 
 1–4 
 4–1 
 (18) 4–3 
 3–4 
 4–2 
 (31) 4–1 
 4–2

Held-over matches 
Matches involving top 16 and wild card players were played at Meadowbank Sports Centre.

  (1) 3–4 
  (16) 4–2 
  (9) 4–1 
  (8) 4–2 
  (5) 4–2 
  4–1 
  (12) 4–1 
  1–4 
  (13) 4–0 
  (4) 4–1 
  (3) 4–0 
  (14) 3–4 
  (11) 4–1 
  (6) 4–2 
  (7) 4–0  
  (10) 4–0 
  (15) 4–1 
  (2) 4–0

Century breaks

Main stage centuries

Total: 86

 147, 107, 104, 102  Judd Trump
 142, 123, 114  Mark Williams
 139, 137, 105, 101  Jack Lisowski
 137, 133, 127, 117, 116, 104, 104, 101, 100  Neil Robertson
 137, 127, 104  Joe O'Connor
 136, 111  Yan Bingtao
 135, 129, 122  Zhao Xintong
 134, 130, 123, 122, 115, 102, 102  Gary Wilson
 134  Tian Pengfei
 133  Zak Surety
 132, 110  Zhou Yuelong
 132, 108  Ding Junhui
 132, 107  Mark Allen
 132  Ben Woollaston
 131, 129, 128, 120  Jamie Jones
 131, 121, 117, 114, 102, 100, 100, 100  Kyren Wilson
 131  Robbie Williams
 124  Aaron Hill
 123  Anthony Hamilton
 122, 109, 101  Hossein Vafaei
 118  Ronnie O'Sullivan
 116  Ricky Walden
 112, 109, 106, 104  Thepchaiya Un-Nooh
 112, 105, 104  Mark Selby
 108, 103  John Higgins
 108  Mark Joyce
 107, 107, 101  Ali Carter
 107, 104, 100  Shaun Murphy
 107  Pang Junxu
 105, 102, 100  Stephen Maguire
 100  Barry Hawkins
 100  Anthony McGill

Qualifying stage centuries

Total: 25

 137  Gary Wilson
 126  Barry Pinches
 125, 120  Ding Junhui
 124  Lyu Haotian
 124  Si Jiahui
 121  David Lilley
 119  Liang Wenbo
 117, 113, 104  Liam Highfield
 117  David Grace
 117  Xu Si
 115  Mitchell Mann
 113  Dylan Emery
 112  Sam Craigie
 111  Dominic Dale
 108  James Cahill
 104  Chang Bingyu
 104  Thepchaiya Un-Nooh
 103  Ali Carter
 102, 100  Stuart Carrington
 101  Scott Donaldson
 101  Wu Yize

References 

Scottish Open
Sport in Scotland
Home Nations Series
European Series
2022
November 2022 sports events in the United Kingdom
December 2022 sports events in the United Kingdom
2022 Scottish Open